Dmytro Shcherbak (born 8 December 1996) is a Ukrainian football player who plays for SC Poltava.

Club career
He made his Russian Premier League debut for FC Anzhi Makhachkala on 5 December 2016 in a game against FC Arsenal Tula.

References

External links

1996 births
Sportspeople from Poltava
Living people
Ukrainian footballers
Ukrainian expatriate footballers
Expatriate footballers in Russia
FC Anzhi Makhachkala players
Russian Premier League players
Ukrainian expatriate sportspeople in Russia
Association football midfielders
FC Kuban Krasnodar players
FC Nizhny Novgorod (2015) players
FC Vorskla Poltava players
SC Poltava players
Ukrainian Premier League players